Juniper Lake could refer to

Juniper Lake (Lassen Peak), a lake located in the southeast corner of Lassen Volcanic National Park
Juniper Lake (Nova Scotia), several lakes with this name in Nova Scotia